Gilbert Holles, 3rd Earl of Clare (24 April 1633 – 16 January 1689) was an English politician who sat in the House of Commons in 1660. He was styled Lord Haughton from 1637 until he succeeded to the title Earl of Clare in 1666.

Life
Holles was the son of John Holles, 2nd Earl of Clare and Elizabeth Vere, daughter of Horace Vere, 1st Baron Vere of Tilbury. He was baptised at the Church of St John-at-Hackney on 18 May 1633. His godfathers were his grandfathers, John Holles, 1st Earl of Clare and Horatio, Baron Vere: his godmother was Mary Courteen, Countess of Kent.

He travelled abroad in 1645. In April 1660, he was elected Member of Parliament for Nottinghamshire in the Convention Parliament.

Holles died in 1689 and was buried at Haughton.

Family
Holles married Grace Pierrepont, daughter of Hon. William Pierrepont and Elizabeth Harris, on 9 July 1655 in St Giles in the Fields Church, London, England. They had seven children:
 John Holles, 1st Duke of Newcastle-upon-Tyne (1662–1711)
 Lady Elizabeth Holles (c. 1657 – 9 November 1725), married in 1676 Christopher Vane, 1st Baron Barnard
 Lady Mary Holles, married Hugh Boscawen
 Lady Grace Holles (d. 13 September 1700), married on 21 May 1686 Thomas Pelham, 1st Baron Pelham of Laughton
 Hon. William Holles
 Hon. Denzell Holles
 Lady Ann Holles

References

Clare, Gilbert Holles, 3rd Earl of
Clare, Gilbert Holles, 3rd Earl of
English MPs 1660
17th-century English nobility
Earls of Clare